Lloyd Aéreo Boliviano S.A.M. (abbreviated LAB and internationally known as LAB Airlines), was the flag carrier and principal airline of Bolivia from 1925 until it ceased operations in 2010. Before its demise it was headquartered in Cochabamba and had its main hubs at Jorge Wilstermann International Airport and Viru Viru International Airport. Founded in September 1925, it was the second oldest airline in South America after Avianca and one of the oldest airlines in the world.

History

The beginnings
Lloyd Aéreo Boliviano (LAB) was founded by German immigrants in August 1925.  On 24 September 1925, the airline launched its services between Cochabamba and Santa Cruz using a single Junkers F13 aircraft.

In July 1930, Lloyd Aéreo began to serve international routes, with scheduled flights between La Paz, where it was based then, and Corumbá, Brazil. On the grounds of a co-operation agreement with Syndicato Condor, an airline catering for the German minority in Brazil, LAB passengers could connect in Corumbá on a flight to Rio de Janeiro, and vice versa. Over the following years, more destinations in Brazil were added, so that Lloyd Aéreo became the second largest airline in South America at that time, only surpassed by Avianca from Colombia. In 1932, the Bolivian government seized all of LAB's planes and staff, so that they could be dispatched for military use during the Chaco War with Paraguay.

Bolivian national airline
In May 1941, LAB was taken over by the government of Bolivia as the country's national airline and Panagra was granted a contract to administer it. In March 1960, Panagra held a 20% interest in LAB and the government of Bolivia was the major shareholder. At this time, Edmundo Gonzalez was the president of the airline and the fleet consisted of seven DC-3s, one DC-4 and six Boeing B-17s. With the Lockheed L-188 Electra joining the fleet in September 1968, LAB was in the position to offer non-stop international flights. A further improvement in comfort and travel times was achieved when Lloyd Aéreo acquired its first jet aircraft (of the Boeing 727 type) in 1970, allowing for the inauguration of flights to Central America and the United States.

At March 1990, the airline had 1,700 employees and was 99.98% owned by the government. By this time the network, which consisted of 21 domestic destinations and 15 international ones (Arica, Asunción, Belo Horizonte, Buenos Aires, Caracas, Cuzco, Lima, Manaus, Miami, Montevideo, Panama, Rio de Janeiro, Salta, Santiago and São Paulo), was served with two Boeing 707-320C, three Boeing 727-200s, two Boeing 727-100s, one Fokker F27-600 and one Fokker F27-200.

Financial difficulties and demise
From 1994 onwards, Lloyd Aéreo Boliviano was encountering rising financial difficulties. As a consequence, the Bolivian government prepared the privatization of the airline and began to negotiate with potential buyers. On 19 October 1995, Brazilian airline VASP acquired 50 percent of the LAB shares.  In an effort to cut costs, VASP aimed at a full merger of the two airlines, with a similar livery and a joint frequent flyer program as initial steps. , 49% and 48.3% of the shares were held by VASP and the Bolivian government, respectively. In 2001, VASP sold its shares in LAB back to Bolivian investors, though, due to the ongoing monetary constraints. On the other hand, in 2004, LAB was awarded shares in Ecuatoriana de Aviación, the national airline of Ecuador at that time, as a compensation for outstanding debts, which led to a codeshare agreement between the two airlines.

From 2006, Lloyd Aéreo had to cut flights because it was in bad financial shape; leased long-haul aircraft (a random mix of Airbus A310, Boeing 757, Boeing 767 or Lockheed L-1011 TriStar at that time) could not be paid for anymore. On 30 March 2007, it was decided by the Bolivian government to shut down Lloyd Aéreo Boliviano, which meant that effective on 1 April, all flight operations were suspended. In October of the same year, Boliviana de Aviación was established as new national airline of Bolivia. LAB operated a limited number of charter flights during late 2007 and early 2008, on behalf of AeroSur, but has since fully gone out of business, with its airline license officially been revoked in 2010.

Destinations

During the 1930s
At that time, Lloyd Aéreo Boliviano offered mostly domestic flights, each of which with several stopovers (which was normal at a time where the range of airlines was very limited compared to today's situation). The route network had two hubs: In Cochabamba, the headquarters of the airline, and in Santa Cruz de la Sierra. Scheduled services were offered to the following destinations:

Bolivia
Cachuela Esperanza
Camiri
Charagua
Cobija
Cochabamba (hub)
Guajará-Mirim
Lagunillas
La Paz
Magdalena
Oruro
Potosí

Puerto Suárez
Riberalta
Roboré
San José de Chiquitos
Santa Ana del Yacuma
Santa Cruz de la Sierra (hub)
Sucre
Tarija
Todos Santos
Trinidad
Vallegrande
Villamontes
Yacuíba

Brazil
Corumbá

In Corumba, passengers could connect on Syndicato Condor flights to destinations within Brazil and even to Europe. Similarly, in La Paz, connecting flights to the Peruvian towns of Arequipa and Lima were offered in co-operation with Deutsche Lufthansa Peru. Like LAB, these airlines were aiming at the German minorities in the respective countries.

During the 1960s
By then, Santa Cruz had replaced Cochabamba as the largest hub for Lloyd Aéreo Boliviano (now flag carrier of Bolivia), with another one having been opened at Trinidad Airport, and international routes being offered from La Paz Airport. The domestic network had grown to extensive size, covering most airports in the country (still relying on multiple-stopover flights). More international routes had been added, with LAB now also offering flights to Chile, Argentina and Peru. The following destinations were served on a scheduled basis in 1964, using Douglas DC-3, DC-6 or Boeing B-17G (the latter being military cargo aircraft converted from a bomber, which could also accommodate passengers).

Bolivia
Apolo
Ascención de Guarayos
Bermejo Airport
Camiri
Cobija
Cochabamba (hub)
Concepcíon
Copacabana, Bolivia
Guayaramerín
La Paz (international focus city)
Magdalena
Puerto Rico
Puerto Suárez
Reyes
Riberalta
Roboré
Rurrenabaque

San Borja
San Ignacio de Moxos
San Ignacio de Velasco
San Javier
San Joaquín
San José de Chiquitos
San Ramón
Santa Ana del Yacuma
Santa Cruz de la Sierra (main hub)
Sucre
Tarija
Todos Santos
Trinidad (hub)
Villamontes
Yacuíba, Tarija

Argentina
Buenos Aires
Salta

Brazil
Corumbá
São Paulo

Chile
Arica

Peru
Lima

During the 1970s
During the 1970s, LAB's President Mario Patino Ayoroa  developed the company's routes and made it an international player. The international network saw further expansion, most notably with the launch of scheduled flights to the United States.

Argentina
Buenos Aires - Ezeiza Airport
Salta - El Ayball Airport

Bolivia
Cochabamba - Jorge Wilstermann International Airport (focus city)
La Paz - El Alto International Airport (focus city)
Santa Cruz de la Sierra - El Trompillo Airport (main hub)
Trinidad - Trinidad Airport

Brazil
Rio de Janeiro - Galeão Airport
São Paulo - Congonhas Airport

	
Chile
Antofagasta - Antofagasta Airport
Arica - Chacalluta Airport
Santiago de Chile - Pudahuel Airport

Panama
Panama City - Tocumen International Airport

Paraguay
Asunción - Presidente Stroessner International Airport

Peru
Lima - Jorge Chávez International Airport

United States
Miami - Miami International Airport

During the 1980s
At that time, the LAB network had been consolidated, appearing more or less in the shape it would retain until the 2000s. The largest Bolivian cities were linked with destinations all over South America, as well as in the United States (international flights usually had several stopovers). International flights as well as hub-to-hub flights were operated using Boeing 727 aircraft, whilst the Fokker F-27 and the similar Fairchild F-27 were deployed on the domestic network. From 1990, Lloyd Aéreo Boliviano moved its main hub in Santa Cruz de la Sierra from El Trompillo Airport to Viru Viru International Airport.

Bolivia
Bermejo - Bermejo Airport
Camiri - Camiri Airport
Cobija - Captain Aníbal Arab Airport
Cochabamba - Jorge Wilstermann International Airport (focus city)
Guayaramerín - Guayaramerín Airport
La Paz - El Alto International Airport (hub)
Magdalena - Magdalena Airport
Puerto Suárez - Puerto Suárez International Airport
Reyes - Reyes Airport
Riberalta - Riberalta Airport
Rurrenabaque - Rurrenabaque Airport
San Borja - Capitán Germán Quiroga Guardia Airport
San Ignacio de Velasco - San Ignacio Airport
San Joaquín - San Joaquín Airport
Santa Ana del Yacuma - Santa Ana del Yacuma Airport
Santa Cruz de la Sierra - El Trompillo Airport (hub) (from 1990 replaced by Viru Viru International Airport)
Sucre - Juana Azurduy de Padilla International Airport
Tarija - Capitán Oriel Lea Plaza Airport
Trinidad - Trinidad Airport
Villamontes - Lieutenant Colonel Rafael Pabón Airport
Yacuíba - Yacuiba Airport

Argentina
Buenos Aires - Ezeiza Airport
Salta - El Ayball Airport

Brazil
Belo Horizonte - Pampulha Airport(Tancredo Neves International Airport from 1990)
Manaus - Eduardo Gomes International Airport
Rio de Janeiro - Galeão Airport
São Paulo - Congonhas Airport

Chile
Arica - Chacalluta Airport
Iquique
Santiago de Chile - Pudahuel Airport

Panama
Panama City - Tocumen International Airport

Paraguay
Asunción - Presidente Stroessner International Airport

Peru
Cusco - Alejandro Velasco Astete International Airport
Lima - Jorge Chávez International Airport

United States
Miami - Miami International Airport

Uruguay
Montevideo - Carrasco International Airport

Venezuela
Caracas - Simón Bolívar Airport

Prior to closure

During the 2000s, LAB offered scheduled flights to the following destinations:

Argentina
Buenos Aires - Ministro Pistarini International Airport
Córdoba - Ingeniero Ambrosio L.V. Taravella International Airport
Salta - Martín Miguel de Güemes International Airport
Tucumán - Benjamín Matienzo International Airport

Bolivia
Cochabamba - Jorge Wilstermann International Airport (hub)
La Paz - El Alto International Airport (focus city)
Santa Cruz de la Sierra - Viru Viru International Airport (hub)
Sucre - Juana Azurduy de Padilla International Airport
Tarija - Capitán Oriel Lea Plaza Airport
Trinidad - Teniente Jorge Henrich Arauz Airport

Brazil
Manaus - Eduardo Gomes International Airport
São Paulo - Guarulhos Airport
Rio de Janeiro - Galeão International Airport

Chile
Santiago de Chile - Comodoro Arturo Merino Benítez International Airport
Arica - Chacalluta International Airport

Colombia
Bogotá - El Dorado International Airport

Cuba
Havana - José Martí International Airport

Ecuador
Guayaquil - Jose Joaquin de Olmedo International Airport
Quito - Mariscal Sucre International Airport

Mexico
Cancún - Cancún International Airport
Mexico City - Mexico City International Airport

Panama
Panama City - Tocumen International Airport

Paraguay
Asuncion - Silvio Pettirossi International Airport

Peru
Cusco - Alejandro Velasco Astete International Airport
Lima - Jorge Chávez International Airport

Spain
Madrid - Madrid-Barajas Airport

United States
Miami - Miami International Airport
Washington, D.C. - Washington Dulles International Airport

Uruguay
Montevideo - Carrasco International Airport

Venezuela
Caracas - Simón Bolívar International Airport

Fleet

Over the years of its existence, Lloyd Aéreo Boliviano operated the following aircraft types:

Accidents and incidents
On 21 August 1944, an LAB Lockheed Model 18 Lodestar (registered CB-25) was destroyed in a fire at La Paz Airport.
On 29 May 1947, an LAB Douglas C-47 Skytrain (registered CB-32) crashed near Trinidad.
On 10 August 1949, an LAB Curtiss-Wright C-46 Commando (registered CB-37) crashed near Rurrenabaque. In September of the same year, a Lodestar (registered CB-26) was damaged beyond repair in a shooting during the Bolivian National Revolution.
In 1950, two LAB C-46s crashed: The one registered CB-51 near Cochabamba on 24 April, its sister aircraft CB-38 on 2 October near La Laguna Lake.
On 1 January 1951, an LAB C-47 (registered CB-31) was damaged beyond repair in a crash-landing at La Paz Airport.
On 3 November 1953, a Lloyd Aéreo Boliviano Douglas DC-3 (registered CP-600) crashed into a mountain near Potosí, killing the 25 passengers and 3 crew members on board. The aircraft had been on a scheduled domestic flight from Camiri to Sucre.
On 5 September 1955, two LAB aircraft collided mid-air over Cochabamba: A DC-3 (registered CP-572) on a scheduled passenger flight, and a Boeing B-17G (CP-597) on a cargo flight. The Boeing crashed, killing all three crew members. The DC-3 managed to perform an emergency landing.
On 25 August 1956, a cargo-configured Lloyd Aéreo DC-3 (registered CP-506) crash-landed at La Paz Airport, killing two out of the three people on board.
On 26 September 1956, the first hijacking of a commercial flight with political purposes was of the Lloyd Aereo Boliviano on 26 September 1956. The airplane (DC-4), carried 47 prisoners. They were being transported from Santa Cruz, Bolivia to the town of El Alto, in La Paz. There, a political group was waiting to take them to a concentration camp located in Carahuara de Carangas, Oruro. The 47 prisoners gained control of the aircraft in mid-flight and rerouted the airplane to Tartagal, Argentina. Two of the 47 prisoners took control of the aircraft controls and received instructions to again reroute to Salta, Argentina as the airfield in Tartagal was not big enough for the DC-4. They did and moments later arrived safely to the city of Salta. They told the government of the injustice they were submitted to, and received political asylum.
On 18 March 1957, another DC-3 (registered CP-535), which had been on a passenger flight from Cochabamba to Oruro, crashed into a mountain near Sayari. All 16 passengers and 3 crew members died.
On 31 December 1959, all 11 occupants of an LAB C-47 (registered CP-584) died when the aircraft crashed shortly after take-off from an airfield near San José de Chiquitos.
On 5 February 1960, a Lloyd Aéreo Boliviano Douglas DC-4 (registered CP-604), that had been on a scheduled passenger flight from Cochabamba to La Paz, crashed shortly after take-off into Laguna Huañacota, a mountain lake, following an engine fire. All 55 passengers and 4 crew members lost their lives (a two-year-old girl could be saved, but later died in hospital).
On 21 August 1962, an LAB C-47 (registered CP-536) crashed near Cochabamba Airport during a post-maintenance test flight, killing four out of the five people on board.
On 15 March 1963 at approximately 13:55 local time, Lloyd Aéreo Boliviano Flight 915 from Arica, Chile to La Paz, that was operated by a Douglas DC-6 (registered CP-707) on this day, crashed into Chachakumani mountain, killing all 36 passengers and three crew members. At the time of the accident, there were poor visibility conditions due to bad weather.
On 4 February 1964, an LAB C-47 aircraft (registered CP-568) crashed shortly after departing Yacuiba Airport, killing two out of the 29 people on board.
On 3 August 1966, an LAB C-46 (registered CP-730) that had been on a cargo flight from Riberalta to Cochabamba crashed into a mountain range of the Andes, killing all three people on board. The accident likely occurred because of a navigational error of the pilot, who had chosen a wrong flight path and subsequently had flown at the wrong altitude.
On 19 April 1968, a Lloyd Aéreo Boliviano DC-3 (registered CP-734) crashed shortly after take-off from an airstrip at Trinidad. Even though the aircraft was damaged beyond repair, there were no fatalities.
On 26 September 1969 at around 15:10 local time, an LAB DC-6 (registered CP-968) carrying 69 passengers and 5 crew members on a scheduled flight from Santa Cruz de la Sierra to La Paz crashed into Mount Choquetanga 176 kilometres away from the destination airport. There were no survivors when the wreckage was found after three days. Seventeen Bolivian football players had been amongst the passengers.
On 16 December 1971, an LAB passenger flight from Sucre to La Paz was hijacked and demanded to be diverted to Chile. The aircraft landed at Cochabamba Airport instead, police forces stormed the plane and arrested the perpetrator. In the ensuing shooting, one crew member and one passenger were killed.
On 13 October 1976 at 13:32 local time, a Jet Power Boeing 707 freighter aircraft (registered N730JP), that had been chartered by LAB to operate a cargo flight from Santa Cruz de la Sierra to Miami, crashed directly after take-off from El Trompillo Airport into a housing area and a crowded football pitch, killing the three crew members as well as 88 people on the ground, making it the deadliest air disaster in Bolivia to date. The accident had likely occurred because the pilots had not selected the correct amount of thrust, so that the aircraft did not gain sufficient height.
On 23 January 1980, a LAB Fairchild F-27J (registered CP-1175) ran off a taxiway whilst being on ground at Santa Ana del Yacuma Airport and went into a ditch, during which the fuel tank was ruptured by debris from the propeller. In the ensuing fire, the aircraft was destroyed, but all 15 passengers and the three crew members could be saved.
On 2 June 1980, a Lloyd Aéreo Boliviano F-27J (registered CP-1117) crashed into a hill whilst approaching Yacuiba Airport, killing the 10 passengers and three crew members on board.
On 16 March 1984, another F-27M (registered CP-862) crashed, this time in a jungle somewhere between Trinidad and San Borja, claiming the lives of the 20 passengers and three crew.
On 23 January 1985, a passenger detonated a bomb in a lavatory on board an LAB flight from La Paz to Santa Cruz de la Sierra, killing him. The aircraft involved, a Boeing 727-200 registered CP-1276, was substantially damaged but could safely be landed. There were no fatalities among the other 119 passengers and seven crew members.
On 31 August 1991, an LAB Boeing 707 (registered CP-1365) was destroyed in a hangar fire at Dothan Regional Airport in the United States.
On 22 December 1994, a Lloyd Aéreo Boliviano Fokker F27 Friendship (registered CP-2165) overran the runway at Guayaramerín Airport following a rejected takeoff and crashed into trees. All 36 passengers and four crew members survived the accident. The planned destination of the scheduled domestic flight had been San Joaquín.
On 9 January 2001 at 17:20 local time, the left main landing gear of an LAB Boeing 727-200 (registered CP-2323) collapsed while taxiing at Buenos Aires Ezeiza Airport prior to a scheduled flight to Santa Cruz de la Sierra. Investigator found that the accident, by which none of the 138 passengers and 8 crew members were injured but left the aircraft damaged beyond repair, happened because of corrosion damage.
On 7 August 2004, an LAB Boeing 767-300ER (registered CP-2425) experienced a hard landing at Viru Viru International Airport following a scheduled flight from Miami, and was substantially damaged.
On 1 February 2008 at 10:35 local time, the pilots of an LAB Boeing 727-200 (registered CP-2429) had to execute a forced landing in a jungle clearing near Trinidad due to fuel exhaustion. The aircraft carrying 151 passengers and 8 crew had been on a scheduled flight from La Paz to Cobija, when it had to divert to Trinidad due to bad weather conditions, ultimately failing make the distance with the remaining fuel. There were no fatalities; the aircraft was damaged beyond repair.

Notes

References

External links

 Lloyd Aereo Boliviano (Archive)
 Lloyd Aereo Boliviano 

Defunct airlines of Bolivia
Airlines established in 1925
Airlines disestablished in 2010
Latin American and Caribbean Air Transport Association
Cochabamba
1925 establishments in Bolivia